A by-election was held for the New South Wales Legislative Assembly electorate of Leichhardt on 10 December 1934 because of the resignation of Joe Lamaro, to contest the federal seat of Watson at the 1934 election, however he was unsuccessful.

Dates

Result

Preferences were not distributed.Joe Lamaro,  resigned.

See also
Electoral results for the district of Leichhardt (New South Wales)
List of New South Wales state by-elections

References

New South Wales state by-elections
1934 elections in Australia
1930s in New South Wales